Marcelo Antonio Ramírez Gormaz (born May 29, 1965) is a retired Chilean football goalkeeper. He was capped 37 times with the Chile national team between 1993 and 2001, and was an unused substitute player for the 1998 FIFA World Cup. Ramírez is described as a late bloomer who was quick off the line and experienced success at saving penalty kicks.

Honours

Club
Colo-Colo
 Primera División de Chile (7): 1986, 1989, 1991, 1993, 1996, 1997–A, 1998
 Copa Libertadores (1): 1991
 Recopa Sudamericana (1): 1992
 Copa Interamericana (1): 1992
 Copa Chile (5): 1985, 1988, 1989, 1994, 1996

References

External links

 Chile at World Cup 1998

1965 births
Living people
Chilean footballers
Association football goalkeepers
Chile international footballers
1998 FIFA World Cup players
Colo-Colo footballers
Naval de Talcahuano footballers
Chilean Primera División players
Deportes Limache managers